Ibbur ("pregnancy" or "impregnation" or "incubation"), is one of the transmigration forms of the soul and has similarities with Gilgul neshamot. Ibbur is always good or positive, while dybbuk, is negative. Ibbur is the most positive form of possession, and the most complicated. It happens when a righteous soul decides to occupy a living person's body for a time, and joins, or spiritually "impregnates" the existing soul. Ibbur is always temporary, and the living person may or may not know that it has taken place. Often the living person has graciously given consent for the Ibbur. The reason for Ibbur is always benevolent—the departed soul wishes to complete an important task, to fulfil a promise, or to perform a mitzvah (a religious duty) that can only be accomplished in the flesh. In Lurianic Kabbalah, ibbur occurs when an incomplete soul which cannot achieve tikun is completed by the addition of the soul of a tzadik,  or spiritual master. Luria believed this to be possible even whilst the possessor was still alive.

Fictional representations
 Richard Zimler, The Warsaw Anagrams, New York: The Overlook Press, 2011,  (an historical novel set in the Warsaw Ghetto and narrated by an Ibbur). According to the San Francisco Chronicle, Zimler's novel, "Deserves a place among the most important works of Holocaust literature."

Bibliography
 Gershom Scholem Major Trends in Jewish Mysticism, New York: Schocken, 1961.  
 Gershom Scholem Kabbalah, New York: Dorset Press, 1987.  
 Howard Schwartz Lilith's Cave: Jewish Tales of the Supernatural, Oxford University Press, 1991.

See also
 Gilgul (Kabbalah)
 Dybbuk

References

External links
 Judaism and Reincarnation: ibbur and dybbuk 
 Understanding Ibbur Neshoma עיבור נשמה from Sefer Gilgulim of Reb Chaim Vital
 Discussion of the Ibbur in relation to a story of the death of ten sages

Kabbalistic words and phrases